The embassy of Peru in Japan represents the permanent diplomatic mission of the South American country in Japan, in addition to two consulates general in Nagoya and Tokyo.

The current Peruvian ambassador to Japan is Roberto Seminario.

History
Both countries established relations in 1873, and 790 Japanese immigrants arrived to Peru 20 years later in 1899. Today, Peru has the second largest Japanese population in Latin America after Brazil.

During the early 20th century, Peru had consulates in Tokyo, Kobe and Osaka. These were closed after Peru severed relations with Japan in January 1942 due to the Attack on Pearl Harbor during World War II. Relations were reestablished after the treaty of San Francisco, and legations between both countries were reopened between 1952 and 1955, being followed in 1956 by an exchange of embassies.

See also
Embassy of Japan, Lima

References

Bibliography

Peru
Tokyo
Japan–Peru relations